Frankie Randall (born Franklin Joseph Lisbona; January 11, 1938 – December 28, 2014) was an American singer and pianist.

Career
In 1964, Randall starred in Wild on the Beach and appeared in The Day of the Wolves (1971). He also appeared many times on the Dean Martin TV show, and hosted the summer version of the show when Martin was not available.  He released dozens of RCA singles and albums from the 1960s onwards. After starting out in pop music, Randall, a piano player, began performing material from The Great American Songbook.

His version of the song "I Can See for Miles" by The Who is included in Rhino Records' album Golden Throats: The Great Celebrity Sing Off.

Accolades
In 2001, a Golden Palm Star on the Palm Springs, California, Walk of Stars was dedicated to Randall .

Inducted into the Las Vegas Casino Legends Hall of Fame in October 2002.

Presented the Amadeus Award by the Desert Symphony on January 11, 2013.

Personal life 
Randall was born Franklin Joseph Lisbona in Passaic, New Jersey on January 11, 1938. 

Randall had five children.

On December 28, 2014, Randall died of lung cancer in Indio, California at the age of 76.

Discography

Relax'n With Chico Randall (Roulette, 1960)
Frankie Randall Sings & Swings (RCA Victor, 1964)
Frankie Randall At It Again! (RCA Victor, 1965)
Going The Frankie Randall Way! (RCA Victor, 1966)
I Remember You (RCA Victor, 1966)
The Mods & The Pops (RCA Victor, 1968)

References

External links

 frankierandall.com (Feb. 18, 2015 archived copy)

1938 births
American male dancers
American male comedians
Musicians from Passaic, New Jersey
Singers from New Jersey
American people of Italian descent
RCA Victor artists
Male actors from New Jersey
Songwriters from New Jersey
20th-century American male actors
20th-century American singers
21st-century American singers
Deaths from lung cancer in California
2014 deaths
20th-century American comedians
21st-century American comedians
20th-century American male singers
21st-century American male singers
American male songwriters